FABD may refer to:
 Florida Association of Band Directors 
 (acyl-carrier-protein) S-malonyltransferase, an enzyme
 Football Association of Brunei Darussalam